Beaver Lake 131 is an Indian reserve in Alberta, Canada, of the Beaver Lake Cree Nation.

References

Bibliography
 

Indian reserves in Alberta
Cree reserves and territories